Walter S. Judd (born 1951) is an American botanist and taxonomist, and distinguished professor in the Department of Botany, University of Florida since 2009.

Career
Judd attended Michigan State University (B.S. 1973, M.S. 1974) and Harvard University (Ph.D. 1978). He became an assistant professor in the Department of Botany at the University of Florida (1978–1983), associate professor (1983–1991) and professor in 1991. He was president of the American Society of Plant Taxonomists 2000–2001.

Contributions
Professor Judd has been a contributor to the Angiosperm Phylogeny Group and produced his own modification of this in 1999, the Judd system.

Awards
American Society of Plant Taxonomists: Asa Gray Award 2011
National Museum of Natural History: José Cuatrecasas Medal for Excellence in Tropical Botany 2012.

Publications

References

Sources
JSTOR: Global Plants
Harvard Botanist Index

1951 births
21st-century American botanists
American taxonomists
Living people
Michigan State University alumni
Harvard University alumni
University of Florida faculty